Frank Edward Panzer (September 1, 1890August 26, 1969) was an American farmer, teacher, and Progressive Republican politician.  He served 30 years in the Wisconsin State Senate, representing Dodge County, and was president pro tempore from 1947 through 1966.

Background 
Panzer was born in the Town of Hubbard in Dodge County on September 1, 1890. He attended Oakfield High School, worked as a farmer, banker, schoolteacher, and telegraph operator. He was elected clerk of his school district in 1920–30, and as town chairman in 1925 (serving until 1966), and as chairman of the Dodge County Board from 1940 to 1966.

State legislative experience 
He was first elected to the Assembly in 1930 as a Progressive Republican with 4,129 votes to 1,582 for Democrat Jacob Scharpf and 68 for Socialist Ada Burow. He ran for re-election in 1932, but lost his seat to Democrat Lorenz Becker.

In 1934 (after the split between the Republicans and the Wisconsin Progressive Party), Panzer was narrowly elected as a Progressive state senator from the 13th district (Dodge and Jefferson counties), with 10,545 votes to 10,089 for Democrat Paul Hemmy; 5,313 for regular Republican Jesse Peters and 528 for Socialist Alfred Nabor. (Democratic incumbent Eugene A. Clifford was running for Congress.) Panzer was defeated by Peters in 1938. He left the Progressive Party, defeated Peters in the 1942 Republican primary election and won the 1942 general election, as well as all subsequent elections through 1966. He was elected President pro tempore of the Senate from 1947 to 1965. He served as Chairman of the Senate Agriculture Committee, as a member on all major committees of the Senate. He died in office in 1969 and was succeeded by Democrat Dale McKenna.

Panzer's daughter Mary E. Panzer eventually became a Republican member of the Assembly and the Senate herself.

References 

1890 births
1969 deaths
Farmers from Wisconsin
County supervisors in Wisconsin
School board members in Wisconsin
Republican Party members of the Wisconsin State Assembly
People from Dodge County, Wisconsin
Wisconsin Progressives (1924)
Republican Party Wisconsin state senators
20th-century American politicians